This page covers all relevant details regarding Cherno More for all official competitions inside the 2018–19 season. These are the First Professional Football League and the Bulgarian Cup.

Transfers

In

Out

Loans in

Loans out

Squad information

Competitions

Overall

Competition record

Minutes on the pitch
Includes injury time.  Positions indicate the most natural position of the particular player, followed by alternative positions where he actually started games during the course of the season.

Correct as of match played on 15 September 2018.

Goalscorers

Last updated: 15 September 2018

Clean sheets

Last updated: 31 August 2018

Own goals

Man of the Match performances 

Last updated: 31 August 2018
Source: Match reports in Competitions, Gong.bg Man of the Match Awards

Disciplinary record 
Correct as of 15 September 2018
Players are listed in descending order of 
Players with the same amount of cards are listed by their position on the club's official website

Suspensions served

Injuries
Players in bold are still out from their injuries.  Players listed will/have miss(ed) at least one competitive game (missing from whole match day squad).

Home attendances
Correct as of match played on 31 August 2018.

{| class="wikitable sortable" style="text-align:center; font-size:90%"
|-
!width=140 | Comp
! style="width:120px;" class="unsortable"| Date
!width=60 | Score
! style="width:250px;" class="unsortable"| Opponent
!width=150 | Attendance
|-
|First League||20 July 2018 || style="background:#cfc;"|2–1 ||Botev Vratsa ||1,700
|-
|First League||4 August 2018 ||bgcolor="#FFCCCC"|1–5 ||Septemvri Sofia ||1,600
|-
|First League||17 August 2018 ||bgcolor="#FFFFCC"|0–0 ||Beroe ||1,580
|-
|First League||31 August 2018 || style="background:#cfc;"|1–0 ||Vitosha Bistritsa ||820
|-
| style="background:silver;"|
| style="background:silver;"|
| style="background:silver;"|
| Total attendance
|5,700
|-
| style="background:silver;"|
| style="background:silver;"|
| style="background:silver;"|
| Total league attendance
|5,700
|-
| style="background:silver;"|
| style="background:silver;"|
| style="background:silver;"|
| Average attendance
|1,425
|-
| style="background:silver;"|
| style="background:silver;"|
| style="background:silver;"|
| Average league attendance
|1,425

Club
Coaching staff
{|class="wikitable"
|-
!Position
!Staff
|-
|Manager|| Ilian Iliev
|-
|Assistant First-team coach|| Petar Kostadinov
|-
|Goalkeeper coach|| Boyan Peykov
|-
|Club doctor|| Dr. Stefan Petrov
|-
|Kinesiotherapist|| Viktor Bumbalov
|-
|Masseur|| Marin Dimov
|-
|Host|| Nikolay Pachkov
|-Other information

References

PFC Cherno More Varna seasons
Cherno More Varna